Bernard Terry Casey (June 8, 1939 – September 19, 2017) was an American actor, poet and professional American football player.

Early life
Casey was born in Wyco, West Virginia, the son of Flossie (Coleman) and Frank Leslie Casey. He graduated from East High School in Columbus, Ohio.

Career

Athletics
Casey was a record-breaking hurdler for Bowling Green State University and helped the 1959 football team win a small college national championship. Casey earned All-America recognition and a trip to the finals at the U.S. Olympic Trials in 1960. In addition to national honors, he won three consecutive Mid-American Conference titles in the high-hurdles, 1958–60.

Casey was the ninth overall selection of the 1961 NFL Draft, taken by the San Francisco 49ers. He played eight NFL seasons (several positions, first five seasons mainly a halfback, last three seasons a flanker (setback wide receiver)): six with the 49ers and two with the Los Angeles Rams. His best-known play came in 1967 for the Rams in the penultimate game of the regular season against the Green Bay Packers. The Rams needed to win to keep their division title hopes alive, but trailed 24–20 with under a minute to play. Facing fourth down, the Packers lined up to punt, but Tony Guillory blocked the Donny Anderson punt and Claude Crabb returned it to the Packer five-yard line. After an incomplete pass, Casey caught the winning touchdown pass from Roman Gabriel with under thirty seconds to play to give the Rams a 27–24 victory. The Rams defeated the Baltimore Colts the following week to win the Coastal Division title at 11–1–2.

Acting

Casey began his acting career in the film Guns of the Magnificent Seven, a sequel to The Magnificent Seven. Then he played opposite fellow former NFL star Jim Brown in the crime dramas ...tick...tick...tick... and Black Gunn.  He played a leading role in the 1972 science fiction TV film Gargoyles. He also played Tamara Dobson's love interest in 1973's Cleopatra Jones.

From there he moved between performances on television and the big screen such as playing team captain for the Chicago Bears in the TV film Brian's Song. In 1979, he starred as widower Mike Harris in the NBC television series Harris and Company, the first weekly American TV drama series centered on a black family. In 1980, he played Major Jeff Spender in the television mini-series The Martian Chronicles, based on the novel by Ray Bradbury.

In 1981, Casey played a detective opposite Burt Reynolds in the feature film Sharky's Machine, directed by Reynolds. He reunited with Reynolds a few years later for the crime story Rent-a-Cop.

In 1983, he played the role of CIA agent Felix Leiter in the non-Eon Productions James Bond film Never Say Never Again. He co-starred in Revenge of the Nerds and had a comedic role as Colonel Rhombus in the John Landis film Spies Like Us. Casey also appeared in the film Hit Man.

Also during his career, he worked with such well-known directors as Martin Scorsese in his 1972 film Boxcar Bertha and appeared on such television series as The Streets of San Francisco.

He played a version of himself, and other football players turned actors, in Keenen Ivory Wayans's 1988 comedic film I'm Gonna Git You Sucka. He played the national head of a black fraternity in 1984's Revenge of the Nerds. He played high school history teacher Mr. Ryan, in Bill & Ted's Excellent Adventure, released in 1989. Casey appeared as a very influential prisoner with outside connections in Walter Hill's Another 48 Hrs.. In 1992, he appeared as a Naval officer on the battleship USS Missouri in Under Siege.

In 1994, Casey guest-starred in a two-episode story arc in Star Trek: Deep Space Nine as the Maquis leader Lieutenant Commander Cal Hudson, and in 1995 as a guest-star on both SeaQuest 2032 as Admiral VanAlden and Babylon 5 as Derek Cranston. In 2006, he co-starred in the film When I Find the Ocean alongside such actors as Lee Majors.

Personal life and death
Casey enjoyed painting and writing poetry. Look at the People, a book of his paintings and poems, was published by Doubleday in 1969. He died at Cedars-Sinai Medical Center in Los Angeles on September 19, 2017, after a stroke.

Filmography

Film

Television

References

Citations

Sources

External links
 
 Bernie Casey at FelixLeiter.com
 Biography at BGSUSports.com

1939 births
2017 deaths
20th-century African-American sportspeople
21st-century African-American people
African-American male actors
African-American male track and field athletes
African-American painters
American football wide receivers
American male film actors
American male hurdlers
American male television actors
Bowling Green Falcons football players
Bowling Green State University alumni
Los Angeles Rams players
Male actors from West Virginia
People from Wyoming County, West Virginia
Players of American football from West Virginia
San Francisco 49ers players
Track and field athletes from West Virginia
Western Conference Pro Bowl players